Patricia Stephanie Cole  (born 5 October 1941) is an English stage, television, radio and film actress, known for high-profile roles in shows such as Tenko (1981–1985), Open All Hours (1982–1985), A Bit of a Do (1989), Waiting for God (1990–1994), Keeping Mum (1997–1998), Doc Martin (2004–2009), Cabin Pressure (2008–2014), Still Open All Hours (2013–2019), Man Down (2014–2017) and as Sylvia Goodwin in ITV soap opera Coronation Street (2011–2013).

She won Best TV Actress at the 1992 British Comedy Awards for her role in Waiting For God and won Best Comedy Performance at the 2012 British Soap Awards for her role in Coronation Street. She was made an OBE in the 2005 Queen's Birthday Honours.

Early life
Cole was born in Solihull, Warwickshire, and trained at the Bristol Old Vic Theatre School from 1958 to 1960 and went on to consolidate her acting skills in repertory theatres around the United Kingdom. She made her stage debut at the age of seventeen playing the eccentric, elderly medium Madame Arcati in Noël Coward's Blithe Spirit. At the age of 63 she returned to the same role when the play was revived at the West End's Savoy Theatre in 2004.

Career
One of Cole's most recognised and popular roles was of Dr Beatrice (Bea) Mason in the 1980s television series Tenko, a drama which chronicled the lives of British women in Singapore after the Japanese invasion and their consequent confinement in a Japanese prisoner of war camp. The starkly realistic series was explicit in its portrayal of the horrific conditions and brutality faced by the women during their imprisonment, and dealt with issues such as rape, stillbirth, lesbianism, suicide, abortion and euthanasia. Cole played the role of the stern, officious yet kindly doctor over three series and a one-off special between 1981 and 1985.

During this same period, Cole also played the elderly, paranoid and morose customer Mrs Delphine Featherstone, nicknamed "The Black Widow", in the BBC comedy Open All Hours. Mrs Featherstone was the only rival to Nurse Gladys Emmanuel for the affections of shopkeeper Arkwright, played by Ronnie Barker (who had recommended her to play the part after seeing her in Tenko), although she was attracted to him only because she liked his stingy ways. Arkwright was scared of her advances and often hid when he saw her approaching the shop. Cole was actually only in her early forties when she took the role; playing characters much older than she actually is (notably in Waiting for God) became a hallmark of her career. She also appeared in a single episode of Fresh Fields as dog-trainer Mrs Robertson (1986).

In 1988, Cole joined actresses Thora Hird, Maggie Smith, Julie Walters and Patricia Routledge in the award-winning first series of Talking Heads, featuring dramatic monologues written for BBC Television by British playwright Alan Bennett. Cole performed the role of Muriel to great acclaim during the half-hour monologue "Soldiering On". In later years, Cole would repeat her performance of this now famous monologue on both the London stage and for BBC Radio.

Another of Cole's famous roles was of bad-tempered retired photojournalist Diana Trent in the sitcom Waiting for God, which ran from 1990 to 1994. Although Diana was supposed to be a pensioner, Cole was actually 48 years old when she took the role, for which she received the 1992 Best TV Comedy Actress award at the British Comedy Awards.

From 2004 to 2009, Cole appeared with Martin Clunes and Caroline Catz in the ITV comedy-drama, Doc Martin as Joan Norton, aunt of Clunes' character Dr Martin Ellingham. In 2006, Cole starred with Victoria Wood in the BAFTA award-winning World War II drama Housewife, 49 as Mrs Waite, the local head of what was then the WVS. Cole also had a small role in the 2008 romantic comedy Miss Pettigrew Lives for a Day as Miss Pettigrew's grumpy boss, Miss Holt.

In April 2011, Cole joined the cast of Coronation Street, playing Sylvia Goodwin, the mother of regular character Roy Cropper. In August 2012, she was cast in an adaptation of the 1938 thriller film The Lady Vanishes on the BBC.

In August 2013, it was announced that Cole had left Coronation Street, just episodes after her onscreen daughter-in-law had been diagnosed with pancreatic cancer. It was initially speculated that her sudden departure was due to illness but Cole later confirmed on Twitter that her already pending departure had been brought forward due to her brother's death.

Since 2013, Cole has reprised her role as Delphine Featherstone in Still Open All Hours. She appears with original actors David Jason, Lynda Baron and Maggie Ollerenshaw.

On Halloween 2018, Stephanie guest starred in the live episode of Inside No 9 entitled 'Dead Line', she played the role of Moira O'Keefe. The episode received critical praise citing it as one of the best bits of television of 2018.

In 2019 Cole appeared in the BBC One comedy Scarborough.

Stage
Cole has also performed as a stage actress for more than fifty years. On the West End stage, she has featured in The Mousetrap in 1968 (Ambassadors Theatre) as Miss Casewell, Noises Off in 1983 (Savoy Theatre), Steel Magnolias in 1989 (Lyric Theatre) and Quartet in 1999 (Albery Theatre). Her most prominent stage role was as Betty in the hit comedy A Passionate Woman written by Kay Mellor. The play, directed by Ned Sherrin, opened at the Comedy Theatre in 1994 and had a nine-month extended run. On the West End's production's last curtain call, Cole was made the subject of This Is Your Life.

Radio
Cole has appeared in several radio series. She starred in the BBC Radio 4 comedy, Ed Reardon's Week as Olive, a student in Ed's writing class. Other work for BBC Radio 4 includes the role of Carolyn Knapp-Shappey, opposite Benedict Cumberbatch and Roger Allam in the successful airline sitcom Cabin Pressure, written by, and also featuring, John Finnemore. She also played opposite Hugh Bonneville in the Sci-fi comedy "Married". and, in 2017, starred in an episode of John Finnemore's Double Acts on Radio 4.

Other
In 1998, Cole's career in comedy was commemorated in the BBC documentary series Funny Women. In the same year, Cole's autobiography A Passionate Life was published. The book's foreword was written by British theatre director Ned Sherrin.

Honours
In 2002, Cole was awarded an honorary Master of Arts degree from the University of Bristol. In 2005, she was made an Officer of the Order of the British Empire (OBE) in the Queen's Birthday Honours List for her services to drama, the elderly and mental health charities.

Cole was voted Solihull's favourite Silhillian in a competition run by Solihull Council in December 2006. She beat Lucy Davis, Martin Johnson and Richard Hammond to pick up the top crown in The S Factor.

Charity work
Cole is an Ambassador for the medical charity Overseas Plastic Surgery Appeal.

Personal life
In 1973, Cole married fight director Henry Marshall, who was one of the founders of the British Academy of Dramatic Combat and was a Master at Arms at the Royal Academy of Dramatic Art. They have a daughter, Emma Battcock (born 1973). They divorced in 1988. In 1998, Cole married fellow actor Peter Birrel after meeting him again, thirty years after they first appeared together in a production of Richard II at the Bristol Old Vic.

Filmography

Film

Television

Awards
1992 British Comedy Awards – Best TV Comedy Actress for Waiting for God
2012 British Soap Awards – Best Comedy Performance for Coronation Street

Notes

References

External links
 

1941 births
Living people
People from Solihull
Alumni of Bristol Old Vic Theatre School
20th-century English actresses
21st-century English actresses
English film actresses
English radio actresses
English soap opera actresses
English stage actresses
English television actresses
Officers of the Order of the British Empire